The following lists events that happened during 1881 in Chile.

Incumbents
President of Chile: Aníbal Pinto (until September 18), Domingo Santa María

Events

January
15 January - Battle of Miraflores
17 January - Occupation of Lima

June
15 June - Chilean presidential election, 1881

July
23 July - Boundary Treaty of 1881 between Chile and Argentina

Deaths
13 January - Robert Souper (b. [[1818 in Chile]1818]])

Undated
José Eusebio Barros Baeza (b. 1810)

References 

 
Years of the 19th century in Chile
Chile